Ossi Juhani Sunell (born 10 January 1930) is a Finnish diplomat.

He was born in Helsinki, and has a master's degree in political science. He was ambassador in Algiers from 1972 to 1975, a negotiating officer from the Ministry for Foreign Affairs from 1975 to 1976, head of the Protocol Department from 1976 to 1979, Ambassador to Ottawa 1979–1982 and Paris 1983–1986, Inspector of Offices 1985–1987, Administrative Under-Secretary of State 1987–1990 and Ambassador in Rome 1990–1993.

References 

Ambassadors of Finland to Canada
Ambassadors of Finland to Algeria
Ambassadors of Finland to France
Ambassadors of Finland to Italy
1930 births
Living people